Zhongyuan station may refer to the following stations:

 Zhongyuan metro station in New Taipei, Taiwan
 Zhongyuan railway station in Henan, China